Aaron Muirhead (born 30 August 1990) is a Scottish professional footballer who currently plays as a defender for Partick Thistle in the Scottish Championship. Muirhead has previously played for Annan Athletic, Partick Thistle and Falkirk, after progressing through Ayr United's youth academy.

Career

Muirhead started his career with Ayr United's youth academy, before signing for Annan Athletic in November 2008, going on to play in 127 matches and scoring 15 goals. Muirhead signed for Partick Thistle in May 2012.

Muirhead is the nephew of Davie Irons, who also played for the Firhill club.

Partick Thistle
Muirhead signed for the Harry Wraggs during the 2012 close season from the Galabankies. In the 2013 Scottish Challenge Cup Final versus his home town club, Queen of the South, Muirhead missed a penalty in the defeat and was sent off for head butting Queens captain, Chris Higgins. Muirhead received a four match suspension following this incident.

Muirhead scored his first Premiership goal for newly promoted Partick Thistle in a 1–1 home draw with Hearts, scoring an 85th-minute penalty. Muirhead then scored his second goal of the season with another penalty versus Kilmarnock in another 1–1 home draw. Muirhead scored his third goal of the season, again with a penalty to make it 1–1 in a 4–1 defeat away to Dundee United. Muirhead also scored a penalty in the Scottish League Cup win versus Cowdenbeath as the Harry Wraggs won 3-1 after extra time.

Falkirk
After leaving Thistle by mutual consent, Muirhead signed for Falkirk in January 2015 alongside former Thistle team-mate Mark Kerr. Muirhead departed the club on 23 January 2019, with his contract being terminated by mutual consent.

Ayr United
On 24 January 2019, Muirhead signed for Ayr United on a contract until the end of the 2019–20 season.

Partick Thistle (second spell)
Muirhead returned to Thistle during the 2022 close season.

Career statistics

Honours
Partick Thistle
  Scottish First Division: 1
 2012–13

References

1990 births
Living people
Footballers from Dumfries
Scottish footballers
Annan Athletic F.C. players
Partick Thistle F.C. players
Falkirk F.C. players
Ayr United F.C. players
Scottish Football League players
Scottish Professional Football League players
Association football defenders